Alice Leonor das Neves Costa is a judge. She is the Presidente de tribunal colectivo under the Tribunal Judicial de Base, a court within the judicial structure in Macau.

References 

Macau judges
Living people
Year of birth missing (living people)